Recently extinct mammals are defined by the International Union for Conservation of Nature (IUCN) as any mammals that have become extinct since the year 1500 CE. Since then, roughly 80 mammal species have become extinct.

Extinction of taxa is difficult to confirm, as a long gap without a sighting is not definitive, but before 1995 a threshold of 50 years without a sighting was used to declare extinction.

One study found that extinction from habitat loss is the hardest to detect, as this might only fragment populations to the point of concealment from humans. Some mammals declared as extinct may very well reappear. For example, a study found that 36% of purported mammalian extinction had been resolved, while the rest either had validity issues (insufficient evidence) or had been rediscovered.

As of December 2015, the IUCN listed 30 mammalian species as "critically endangered (possibly extinct)".

Conventions
All species listed as "Extinct" are classified as being extinct (no known remaining individuals left) by the International Union for Conservation of Nature (IUCN). All species listed as Extinct in the wild are classified as being extinct in the wild, meaning that all remaining individuals of the species reside in captivity. All species listed as "Possibly extinct" are classified as being critically endangered, as it is unknown whether or not these species are extinct. Extinct subspecies such as the Javan tiger (Panthera tigris sondaica) are not listed here as the species, in this case Panthera tigris, is still extant. The IUCN Redlist classification for each species serves as a citation, and the superscripted "IUCN" by the date is a link to that species' page. A range map is provided wherever available, and a description of their former or current range is given if a range map is not available.

Causes of extinction 
Habitat degradation is currently the main anthropogenic cause of species extinctions. The main cause of habitat degradation worldwide is agriculture, with urban sprawl, logging, mining and some fishing practices close behind. The physical destruction of a habitat, both directly (deforestation for land development or lumber) and indirectly (burning fossil fuels), is an example of this.

Also, increasing toxicity, through media such as pesticides, can kill off a species very rapidly, by killing all living members through contamination or sterilizing them. Persistent organic pollutants (POPs), for example, can bioaccumulate to hazardous levels, getting increasingly more dangerous further up the food chain.

Disease can also be a factor: white nose syndrome in bats, for example, is causing a substantial decline in their populations and may even lead to the extinction of a species.

Overhunting also has an impact. Terrestrial mammals, such as the tiger and deer, are mainly hunted for their pelts and in some cases meat, and marine mammals can be hunted for their oil and leather. Specific targeting of one species can be problematic to the ecosystem because the sudden demise of one species can inadvertently lead to the demise of another (coextinction) especially if the targeted species is a keystone species. Sea otters, for example, were hunted in the maritime fur trade, and their drop in population led to the rise in sea urchins—their main food source—which decreased the population of kelp—the sea urchin's and Steller's sea cow's main food source—leading to the extinction of the Steller's sea cow.

Australia 
Island creatures are usually endemic to only that island, and that limited range and small population can leave them vulnerable to sudden changes. While Australia is a continent and not an island, due to its geographical isolation, its unique fauna has suffered an extreme decline in mammal species, 10% of its 273 terrestrial mammals, since European settlement (a loss of one to two species per decade); in contrast, only one species in North America has become extinct since European settlement. Furthermore, 21% of Australia's mammals are threatened, and unlike in most other continents, the main cause is predation by feral species, such as cats.

Extinct species

A species is declared extinct after exhaustive surveys of all potential habitats eliminate all reasonable doubt that the last individual of a species, whether in the wild or in captivity, has died. Recently extinct species are defined by the IUCN as becoming extinct after 1500 CE.

Extinct subspecies

Extinct in the wild

A species that is extinct in the wild is one which has been categorized by the International Union for Conservation of Nature (IUCN) as only known by living members kept in captivity or as a naturalized population outside its historic range due to massive habitat loss. A species is declared extinct in the wild after thorough surveys have inspected its historic range and failed to find evidence of a surviving individual.

Possibly extinct

Extinction of taxa is difficult to detect, as a long gap without a sighting is not definitive. Some mammals declared as extinct may very well reappear. For example, a study found that 36% of purported mammalian extinction had been resolved, while the rest either had validity issues (insufficient evidence) or had been rediscovered. As of December 2015, the IUCN listed 30 mammalian species as "critically endangered (possibly extinct)".

See also
 Holocene extinction
 List of extinct animals
 List of extinct birds
 Lists of mammals by population

Notes

References

Mammals
M

recently extinct